Danielle Fournier (born 1955) is a Quebec educator and writer.

She was born in Montreal and received a PhD in literature from the Université de Sherbrooke. She also studied German at the University of New Brunswick. She has taught at the college and university level at various institutions including the Université de Sherbrooke, the University of New Brunswick, at McGill University, the Université du Québec à Montréal, at Concordia University and at the Collège Jean-de-Brébeuf, where she held a permanent position.

Fournier has written poetry, fiction and critical essays for various magazines such as Exit, Arcade, Estuaire, Moebius, Spirale, Urgences, Québec français and Voix et Images. Her work has also appeared in a number of anthologies. In 2003, she was awarded the Prix Alain-Grandbois for her poetry collection Poèmes perdus en Hongrie. In 2005, Il n'y a rien d'intact dans ma chair was a finalist for the Governor General's Award for French-language poetry and, in 2010, her collection effleurés de lumière won that award.

Selected works 
 Langue éternelle, poetry (1998)
 Poèmes perdus en Hongrie, poetry (2002)
 Le chant unifié, novel (2005)

References 

1955 births
Living people
Canadian poets in French
Canadian novelists in French
Governor General's Award-winning poets
Canadian women poets
Canadian women novelists
Canadian women essayists
20th-century Canadian poets
20th-century Canadian novelists
20th-century Canadian women writers
21st-century Canadian poets
21st-century Canadian novelists
21st-century Canadian women writers
Writers from Montreal
Université de Sherbrooke alumni
University of New Brunswick alumni
Academic staff of the Université de Sherbrooke
Academic staff of the University of New Brunswick
Academic staff of McGill University
Academic staff of the Université du Québec à Montréal
Academic staff of Concordia University
20th-century Canadian essayists
21st-century Canadian essayists
Prix Alain-Grandbois